"Vlach" is a historical exonym used for Romance-speaking groups in Southeastern Europe:

Vlachs of Vlach may also refer to:

 Vlachs (social class), a social and fiscal class in late medieval and early modern Southeastern Europe
 Vlachs laws, a set of late medieval and early modern customary laws on vlachs as a social class 
 Statutes of the Vlachs or Statuta Valachorum (1630), a decree of Emperor Ferdinand II
 Maurovlachs or Morlachs, medieval and early modern term for a group in Southeastern Europe
 "Vlach Millet", officially Ullah Millet, a distinctive community (millet) recognized in 1905 within the Ottoman Empire for the Aromanians
 Vlachs in medieval Serbia, a distinctive group in medieval Serbia
 Vlachs in the history of Croatia, a distinctive group in the history of Croatia
 Cieszyn Vlachs, a modern-time ethnic minority
 Moravian Vlachs, historical European ethnic group
 Vlach (surname), a surname, and also a nickname
 Mitre the Vlach, revolutionary from Macedonia
 Vlach Quartet, musical ensemble

See also
 Vlachs of Serbia
 Vlah (disambiguation)
 Wallach (disambiguation)
 Wallachia (disambiguation)
 Oláh (disambiguation)